Arkh-e Kuchek (also Romanized as Arkh-e Kūchek) is a village in Jafarbay-ye Sharqi Rural District, Gomishan District, Torkaman County, Golestan Province, Iran. At the 2006 census, its population was 571, with 114 families.

References 

Populated places in Torkaman County